Prehistoric tsunamis are tsunamis and so-called "megatsunamis" that occurred before recorded history. The events have been identified through oral tradition and/or geological evidence. Those events that have been identified through contemporary records are listed as historic tsunamis.

List

References

Prehistoric
tsunamis